Richard Joyner Holland (August 12, 1925 – April 16, 2000) was an American politician who was elected to six terms in the Virginia Senate.

References

External links

1925 births
2000 deaths
Democratic Party Virginia state senators
University of Virginia alumni
University of Virginia School of Law alumni
20th-century American politicians
21st-century American politicians